Jamshid Hashempour (born March 23, 1944), birth name Jamshid Arya, is an Iranian actor. Jamshid Hashempour has starred in action and thriller movies. He has performed in more than 80 films.

Filmography
 Dadshah (1983)
 Eagles (1984)
 Taraj (1985)
 Yoozpalang (1985)
 The Blade and the Silk (1987)
 The Grand Day (1989)
 Mother (1991)
 The Last Act (1991)
 The Secret of the Red Flower (1992) 
 Love Stricken (1992)
 The Viper (1992)
 Flowers and Bullets (1992)
 Yaran (1993)
 Parvaz az Ordoogah (1993)
 Toofan's Strike (1994)
 Punishment (1995)
 Aghrab (1996)
 Heeva (1998)
 Yaghi (1998)
 The Red Ribbon (1998) 
 Eagle Eye (1998)
 Swan Song (2000)
 Mosafere Rey (2001)
 Safar be Farda (2001)
 The Poisonous Mushroom (2002) 
 The Fifth Reaction (2003)
 Mazrae-ye Pedari (2003)
 A Little Kiss (2005)
 Homicide Online (2005)
 M Like Mother (2006)
 Four Finger (2007)
 A Petition for Allah (2008)
 Kolbeh (2009)
 Face to Face (2009)
 Keyfar (2010)
 Guidance Patrol (2012)
 Hush! Girls Don't Scream (2013) 
 I’m Diego Maradona (2014) 
 Shahrzad (2015)
 Mission Impossible (2018)
 Aghazadeh (TV series) (2020)
 Shishlik (2021)

References

External links

in Soureh Cinema

1944 births
Living people
People from Tehran
Male actors from Tehran
Iranian male film actors
Iranian male television actors
Crystal Simorgh for Best Supporting Actor winners